Sir Thomas Butler or Boteler (1513/14 – 22 September 1579), of Bewsey and Warrington, Lancashire, was an English politician.

He was a Member (MP) of the Parliament of England for Lancashire in March 1553 and 1571. He would be knighted in 1576.

References

1513 births
1579 deaths
People from Warrington
English MPs 1553 (Edward VI)
English MPs 1571
Members of the Parliament of England (pre-1707) for Lancashire